Sun Management Center is a computer system monitoring product from Sun Microsystems.

Sun Management Center (Sun MC) is a systems management and monitoring tool for enterprise-wide management of Sun servers, desktops and storage devices. It provides in-depth monitoring of Sun hardware and the most comprehensive set of metrics for the Solaris OS, including support for Solaris Containers.

Sun MC was originally named Sun Enterprise SyMON, and was co-developed by Halcyon Monitoring Solutions, Inc. Clients are available for Solaris on SPARC and x86 systems as well as Linux on x86 systems.

Native integration support is available for IBM Tivoli and CA Unicenter; Halcyon provides integrations for HP Openview, Micromuse Netcool and other frameworks.

Protocols used
 SNMP v2usec (optional encryption libraries), v1 and v3 (compatible)
 HTTP with SSL
 RMI
 TCP/IP for Probe Connections (adhoc commands)

References

External links 
 

Sun Microsystems software